Alrance is a commune in the Aveyron department in the Occitanie region of southern France.

The inhabitants of the commune are known as Alrançais or Alrançaises

Geography
Alrance is located some 30 km west of Millau and about 50 km north-east of Albi.  The commune can be accessed by the D56 road which runs north-east from Durenque and intersects the road D25 in the commune. It continues north through the commune to Arvieu. The D25 comes south-east from Salmiech through most of the length of the commune and continues south-east to Villefranche-de-Panat. Access to the village is from the north-east on road D659 which runs off the D577 south of the Lac de Pareloup. The D659 runs south-west and ends at the village. The D528 also runs off the D25 in the south of the commune to the village.

The commune is mostly farmland with some forest and covered by many country roads. There are a number of other hamlets and villages in the commune. These are:

L'Adrech
Bonneguide
Boussinesq
Le Bouviale
La Capelle Farcel
La Coste
Las Fenials
Flauvelou
Fretanels
Le Jouanesq
Lacan
Le Mas Nespoulous
Le Mas Viala
Le Mas Vialet
Montcouzac
Nazareth
La Niade
Pentezac
Peyrebrune
La Rouquette
Le Sales
La Vacaresse

A number of streams rise in the commune and flow to the Lac de Villefranche-de-Panat at the southern border of the commune. The streams include L'Alrance, Ruisseau du Lagasi, and several others. Some streams rise in the north of the commune and flow northwards eventually joining the river Céor which eventually flows to the Viaur at Castelpers.

Neighbouring communes and villages

Administration
List of Successive Mayors of Alrance

Population

Sites and Monuments

The Lac de Villefranche-de-Panat just south of the commune border provides power and water activities for the commune
The Church of Alrance and Church of La Capelle-Farcel
The Tower of Peyrebrune (a chapel and remains of a castle)

Notable People linked to the commune
Jean-Baptiste Angles, a missionary in Japan.

See also 
 Communes of the Aveyron department

References

External links
The tower of Peyrebrune in Alrance
Alrance on Géoportail, National Geographic Institute (IGN) website 
Alrance on the 1750 Cassini Map

Communes of Aveyron